Robert Charles Blagrave (1879–1970) was a Canadian Anglican priest in the 20th century.

Robert was born in Rawdon, Quebec, educated at McGill University and ordained in 1904. After a curacy in Coe Hill he held incumbencies at Rawdon, Belleville and  Parkdale He was Archdeacon of Peterborough from 1932 to 1956; Rector of Hamilton from 1936 to 1950; Archdeacon of Wentworth from 1950 to 1955; and Archdeacon of Niagara from 1956 to 1963.

He died on 26 November 1970.

References

Full text of "Proceedings: Grand Lodge of A.F. & A.M. of Canada, 1971"

Archdeacons of Niagara
Archdeacons of Peterborough, ON
Archdeacons of Wentworth, ON
McGill University alumni
20th-century Canadian Anglican priests
Canadian Freemasons
People from Belleville, Ontario
1879 births
1970 deaths